Aundell Terrell Jr. (born September 23, 1998) is an American football cornerback for the Atlanta Falcons of the National Football League (NFL). He played college football at Clemson and was drafted by the Falcons in the first round of the 2020 NFL Draft.

Early years
Terrell attended Westlake High School in Atlanta, Georgia. He played cornerback and wide receiver in high school. A five-star recruit, he played in the 2017 Under Armour All-America Game. He committed to Clemson University to play college football.

College career
As a true freshman at Clemson in 2017, Terrell played in 14 games, recording 15 tackles and an interception. As a sophomore in 2018, he started all 15 games and had 53 tackles, three interceptions and a touchdown. In the 2019 College Football Playoff National Championship he returned an interception 44 yards for a touchdown against Alabama quarterback Tua Tagovailoa. Terrell returned as a starter his junior year in 2019.  Following a junior season where he was named to the first-team All-ACC, Terrell announced that he would forgo his senior season and declared for the 2020 NFL Draft.

Statistics

Professional career

The Atlanta Falcons selected Terrell in the first round (16th overall) of the 2020 NFL Draft. Terrell was the third cornerback drafted in 2020, after Jeff Okudah (3rd overall) and C. J. Henderson (9th overall). On July 20, 2020, the Falcons signed Terrell to a fully-guaranteed four-year, $14.31 million contract that includes a signing bonus of $7.96 million. He was placed on the reserve/COVID-19 list on September 26, 2020, prior to week 3 after testing positive for the virus. He was activated on October 8, 2020.

2020 season 
In Week 6 against the Minnesota Vikings, Terrell recorded his first career interception off a pass thrown by Kirk Cousins during the 40–23 win. In Week 13 against the Los Angeles Chargers, Terrell had a career-high 13 tackles in a 17–20 loss.

2021 season 
In Week 9 against the New Orleans Saints, Terrell had 5 tackles and a career-high 3 passes defended in the 27–25 win. In Week 11 against the New England Patriots, Terrell had his first interception of the season in the 0–25 loss. In Week 14, Terrell had an interception in a 29–21 win over the Carolina Panthers. Terrell recorded his third interception of the season in Week 17 against the Buffalo Bills.

On January 14, 2022, Terrell was named second-team All-Pro. He received an overall grade of 82.7 from Pro Football Focus, 2nd among qualifying cornerbacks in 2021.

NFL career statistics

Personal life
Aundell Terrell Jr. was the second of four children born to Aundell Terrell Sr. and his wife Aliya. The family moved from Rochester, New York, to Atlanta, Georgia, in 2001. Terrell Jr.'s son, Aundell III, was born in 2019.

References

External links
Atlanta Falcons bio
Clemson Tigers bio

1998 births
Living people
Players of American football from Atlanta
American football cornerbacks
Clemson Tigers football players
Atlanta Falcons players